Pierre Villon (27 August 1901 in Soultz-Haut-Rhin, Haut-Rhin – 6 November 1980 in Vallauris, Alpes-Maritimes) was a member of the French Communist Party and of the French Resistance during World War II. With his true name of Roger Ginsburger, he was an architect. In spring 1944, with  Maurice Kriegel-Valrimont and Jean de Voguë, he was one of the three leaders of the Committee of Military action created by the Conseil National de la Résistance (CNR).

Delegated to the Provisional Consultative Assembly, he was then appointed to the two national constituent assemblies as a member of the French Communist Party, then to the French National Assembly from 1946. He was constantly re-elected in Allier until 1978 (except during the 1962 - 1967 term when his seat was occupied by the socialist Charles Magne, mayor of Gannat). He was also an active member of the Peace Movement.

He was the husband of Marie-Claude Vaillant-Couturier.

External links
Biography 

1901 births
1980 deaths
People from Soultz-Haut-Rhin
Alsatian Jews
Jewish French politicians
Politicians from Grand Est
French Communist Party politicians
Members of the Constituent Assembly of France (1945)
Members of the Constituent Assembly of France (1946)
Deputies of the 1st National Assembly of the French Fourth Republic
Deputies of the 2nd National Assembly of the French Fourth Republic
Deputies of the 3rd National Assembly of the French Fourth Republic
Deputies of the 1st National Assembly of the French Fifth Republic
Deputies of the 3rd National Assembly of the French Fifth Republic
Deputies of the 4th National Assembly of the French Fifth Republic
Deputies of the 5th National Assembly of the French Fifth Republic
20th-century French architects
Communist members of the French Resistance
Red Orchestra (espionage)
Members of the Front National (French Resistance) movement